A total solar eclipse will occur on Wednesday, May 11, 2078. A solar eclipse occurs when the Moon passes between Earth and the Sun, thereby totally or partly obscuring the image of the Sun for a viewer on Earth. A total solar eclipse occurs when the Moon's apparent diameter is larger than the Sun's, blocking all direct sunlight, turning day into darkness. Totality occurs in a narrow path across Earth's surface, with the partial solar eclipse visible over a surrounding region thousands of kilometres wide.

Related eclipses

Solar eclipses 2076–2079

Saros 139

Inex series

Tritos series

Inex series

Notes

References

2078 05 11
2078 in science
2078 05 11
2078 05 11